Daniel John Bradbury (born 26 July 1999) is an English professional golfer who plays on the European Tour. He claimed his first win as a professional in his third European Tour start at the 2022 Joburg Open.

Amateur career
Bradbury attended Lincoln Memorial University from 2017 to 2021, where he was the 2020 and 2021 South Atlantic Conference Men's Athlete of the Year. He played his final collegiate season at Florida State University in 2022.

Professional career
Bradbury turned professional in July 2022 and made his first start at the Cazoo Classic, played at Hillside Golf Club in Southport. He missed the cut. In November 2022, in his third start on the European Tour and playing on a sponsor's invite, Bradbury won the Joburg Open, an event also co-sanctioned by the Sunshine Tour. He shot a final score of 263 (21 under par) to win by three shots ahead of Sami Välimäki. The win also gained him an exemption into the 2023 Open Championship.

Amateur wins
2018 Tennessee River Rumble, Myrtle Beach Intercollegiate
2019 Bearcat Golf Classic, State Farm Intercollegiate, Men's South Region Preview
2020 Battle at Hilton Head
2021 Bearcat Golf Classic, Argonaut Invitational, SAC Championship

Source:

Professional wins (1)

European Tour wins (1)

1Co-sanctioned by the Sunshine Tour

References

External links

English male golfers
European Tour golfers
Florida State Seminoles men's golfers
1999 births
Living people